Stettler can mean the following:

Places
Stettler, Alberta, a town in Canada
County of Stettler No. 6, a municipal district in central Alberta, Canada
Drumheller-Stettler, a provincial electoral district in Alberta, Canada
Lacombe-Stettler, a defunct electoral district
Stettler (provincial electoral district), a defunct electoral district
Stettler Airport, a registered aerodrome near Stettler, Alberta
Frank C. Stettler House, a historic building in Portland, Oregon

People
Carl Stettler (1861–1920), founder of the Town of Stettler
Ernst Stettler (1921–2001), Swiss cyclist
Gordon Stettler (1900–1951), Australian rugby league footballer
Heinz Stettler (1952–2006), Swiss bobsledder
Kurt Stettler (1932–2020), Swiss football goalkeeper
Kurt Stettler (cyclist) (1910–1974), Swiss cyclist
Martha Stettler (1870–1945), Swiss painter and engraver
Robert Stettler, Swiss curler

Other uses
Stettler Lightning, an ice hockey team
, a Royal Canadian Navy River-class frigate named after the town